Muhammad Fazlur Rahman Ansari (14 August 1914 – 3 June 1974) was a Pakistani Islamic scholar and philosopher. 

He was the founder of the Aleemiyah Institute of Islamic Studies and Founder President of the World Federation of Islamic Missions.

Early life 
Muhammad was born in Saharanpur, British India, on 14 August 1914. At the age of six and a half years, he memorised the Quran at the Madrassah Islamiah of Muzaffarnagar, Uttar Pradesh.

Education and Training 
He was trained by Muhammad Abdul Aleem Siddique in the mid-30s as the Resident-Missionary and Editor of Genuine Islam , an international magazine of the All Malaya Muslim Missionary Society which wrote on political Zionism, its threat to Palestine , the Ahmadiyat of Mirza Ghulam Ahmad who claimed to be the Second Coming of Jesus .It contained many articles by scholars such as the Nizam of Hyderabad, Shaykhul Azhar Muhammad Mustafa al Maraghi, Syed Sulaiman Nadvi, Muhammad Marmaduke Pickthall, Muhammad Asad  etc.

In 1933, Ansari enrolled for his BA degree at the Aligarh Muslim University, and majored in Philosophy, English and Arabic. He eventually earned a PhD in Philosophy.

Later life and death 
Having migrated to Pakistan in 1947, on the advice of his father-in-law, the scholar Muhammad Abdul Aleem Siddiqi, he worked with him specially in Guyana to defend Sunni Barelvi practices and traditions such as Mawlid and Ziarah. 
He died in Karachi in 1974, at the age of 60, during his last days being a teacher of Islamic studies at the Karachi University.

Books and booklets 
His books and booklets include: 
The Qurʼanic foundations and structure of Muslim society in 2 volumes
Islam and Christianity in the modern world; being an exposition of the Qurʼanic view of Christianity in the light of modern research
Islam to the modern mind : lectures in South Africa, 1970 & 1972
Foundations of faith : a commonsense exposition
Through science and philosophy to religion : being a treatise on the necessity of divine revelation
Islam versus Marxism; being an essay written for the Muslim - Christian convention held in Lebanon in 1954

References

External links
Official YouTube Site of audio lectures
Audio Lectures
Books
Biography

Pakistani Sunni Muslim scholars of Islam
Pakistani philosophers
Islamic philosophers
Muhajir people
20th-century Muslim scholars of Islam
Aligarh Muslim University alumni
Academic staff of the University of Karachi
Pakistani Sufis
Barelvis
1914 births
1974 deaths